The International Intersex Forum is an annual event organised, then later supported, by the ILGA and ILGA-Europe that  and organisations from multiple regions of the world, and it is believed to be the first and only such intersex event.

Predecessor gatherings

The International Intersex Forum is preceded by several other smaller gatherings, including an ISNA retreat in 1996 that brought together activists from North America and New Zealand, and also a summer school organised by OII-France in 2006. The retreat is documented in a short movie entitled Hermaphrodites Speak and the film Intersexion, and the summer school in a book, A qui appartiennent nos corps? Féminisme et luttes intersexes.

First international intersex forum, Brussels, September 2011

This event, described as "historic" brought together 24 people from 17 intersex organisations to create a new informal network and agree a closing statement. The statement reads:

Spokespeople for the first forum were Sally Gross of Intersex South Africa, Hiker Chiu of Oii-Chinese, Gina Wilson of Organisation Intersex International Australia, Del LaGrace Volcano, Mauro Cabral and Jim Ambrose, alongside ILGA and ILGA-Europe representatives Ruth Baldacchino and Silvan Agius.

Second Forum, Stockholm, December 2012

This forum brought together 37 activists who represented 33 intersex organisations and institutions, selected from an open call application process managed by ILGA and ILGA Europe. The participants made a series of "demands aiming to end discrimination against intersex people and to ensure the right of bodily autonomy and self-determination", including ending infanticide, terminations of intersex fetuses, ending "normalising" surgeries and providing human and citizenship rights: Countries represented included Argentina, Australia, Canada, France, Germany, Taiwan, Tunisia, Uganda and the US.

The Forum also, upon suggestion of author and activist Hida Viloria then global Chair of the Organisation Intersex International and founder of Intersex Campaign for Equality, called for human rights for intersex people. This took place by presenting an open letter authored by Viloria and sent on behalf of signing participants at the Forum to United Nations High Commissioner for Human Rights, Navi Pillay. The first European intersex NGO, OII Europe, was founded at the event.

Third Forum, Malta, November–December 2013

The third forum was held in Malta with 34 people representing 30 organisations "from all continents". The Malta declaration, the closing statement, affirmed the existence of intersex people, reaffirmed "the principles of the First and Second International Intersex Fora and extend the demands aiming to end discrimination against intersex people and to ensure the right of bodily integrity, physical autonomy and self-determination". For the first time, participants made a statement on birth registrations, in addition to other human rights issues:

The forum called on:

The Forum was organized by ILGA Europe's Silvan Agius and Ruth Baldacchino, and three intersex activists selected from an open call application process managed by ILGA Europe: Mauro Cabral, of Argentina, Mani Bruce Mitchell, of New Zealand, and Hida Viloria of OII-USA (now Intersex Campaign for Equality). Attending participants included Sean Saifa Wall and Pidgeon Pagonis for AIC (now interACT), Morgan Carpenter and Tony Briffa from Organisation Intersex International Australia, Intersex Austria Holly Greenberry from Intersex UK, Miriam van der Have and Inge Intven of Nederlandse Netwerk Intersekse/DSD (NNID), and representatives of Zwischengeschlecht, and IVIM/OII Deutschland.

Fourth Forum, Amsterdam, April 2017

The Fourth Forum took place in Amsterdam in April 2017, followed by publication of a media statement. Forty participants, including representatives of intersex organizations and independent advocates, came from all continents, including Africa, Asia, Europe, Post-Soviet countries, Latin America and the Caribbean, North America, and Oceania. The Forum affirmed the Malta declaration by the Third Forum, and called for a Fifth Forum to take place in Global South.

Regional fora and statements

Between 2017 and 2018, a series of regional fora were held:

 In March 2017, Australian and New Zealand intersex organizations and activists published a regional consensus "Darlington Statement", calling for legal reform, including the criminalization of deferrable intersex medical interventions on children, an end to legal classification of sex, and improved access to peer support.
 Following a European conference in March, the "Vienna Statement" was published. It called for an end to human rights violations, and recognition of rights to bodily integrity, physical autonomy and self-determination.
 In December 2017, African intersex activists published a Statement setting out local demands, adding a call to end infanticide and killings due to traditional and religious beliefs.
 In February 2018, Asian intersex activists published the "Statement of Intersex Asia and the Asian Intersex Forum", setting out local demands, including a call to end infanticide, abandonment and honor killings.
 In April 2018, Latin American and Caribbean intersex activists published the "San José de Costa Rica statement", defining local demands and including an acknowledgement of "all the ways in which our experiences have been historically and repeatedly colonized, from the invasion of our lands to that of our bodies".

See also

 Intersex
 Intersex human rights
 Intersex civil society organizations

References

Events about intersex
Intersex rights organizations
International Lesbian, Gay, Bisexual, Trans and Intersex Association
LGBT conferences